Michael Knauth (born 24 June 1965, in Wolfsburg) is a German former field hockey player who competed in the 1992 Summer Olympics and in the 1996 Summer Olympics.

References

External links
 

1965 births
Living people
German male field hockey players
Olympic field hockey players of Germany
Field hockey players at the 1992 Summer Olympics
Field hockey players at the 1996 Summer Olympics
Olympic gold medalists for Germany
Olympic medalists in field hockey
Medalists at the 1992 Summer Olympics
People from Wolfsburg
Sportspeople from Lower Saxony